Arlington Stadium was a baseball stadium located in Arlington, Texas, United States, located between Dallas and Fort Worth, Texas. It served as the home for the Texas Rangers (MLB) from 1972 until 1993, after which the team moved into The Ballpark in Arlington (now Choctaw Stadium).

History

Early years as a minor league stadium
The stadium was built in 1965 as Turnpike Stadium, a minor league ballpark seating 10,000 people named for the nearby Dallas–Fort Worth Turnpike (now part of Interstate 30, and known as the Tom Landry Highway). The Fort Worth Cats of the Texas League moved there as the Dallas–Fort Worth Spurs, and played there for the next seven years, setting many Texas League attendance records during their tenure at the stadium, especially after it expanded to 20,500 seats in 1970.

However, the stadium's real purpose was to attract a major league team to the Metroplex. It had been built to be upgraded to Major League standards of the era, and was designed to be expandable to up to 50,000 seats (although its final actual capacity was 7,000 seats below that). Due to its location in a natural bowl, only minimal excavations (such as connecting dugouts directly to the clubhouses) would be necessary for it to be ready for a big-league team. Although it was built primarily with baseball in mind, its general shape was very similar to the major league multi-purpose stadiums that were beginning to emerge in the mid-1960s. In fact, the stadium was designed to accommodate football, but the Dallas Cowboys were never interested in playing in the stadium. The Metroplex had been mentioned as a possible expansion site since the 1950s, and Arlington Mayor Tom Vandergriff figured that Arlington, halfway between the two cities, would be the best site for a prospective major league team.

1970s–1980s
In 1971, the struggling second incarnation of the Washington Senators announced their intentions to move to the Metroplex under the banner of the Texas Rangers. The stadium was expanded to seat over 35,700 people, and was renamed Arlington Stadium. It was the fifth former minor league park converted for use by a major-league team (not counting instances where minor-league parks served as temporary homes), after Baltimore's Memorial Stadium, Kansas City's Municipal Stadium, Minnesota's Metropolitan Stadium and Seattle's Sick's Stadium.

The stadium played host to its first major league game on April 21, 1972, when the Rangers inaugurated the stadium by defeating the California Angels, 7-6; MLB's first-ever strike had disrupted the start of the 1972 season, hence the later than anticipated opening day.

The park had a skeletal, jerry-built feel, and it was obvious that it had once been minor-league. Before the upper deck was added in 1978, fans entered at the very top of the stadium and walked down to their seats. It had the largest bleacher section in baseball, stretching from both foul poles. Early in the stadium's existence, the stadium could be converted for football by swiveling the third-base grandstands into the outfield. In the process, people sitting in the left-field bleachers had their view cut off. When a football game was played at the stadium, an auxiliary press box, located near the first base side, was used. With the 1978 renovations, however, the stadium was locked in its baseball configuration for the remainder of its existence, although the football press box remained until the stadium's closure.

Although it had been built for baseball, Arlington Stadium had a number of drawbacks. Even after the addition of the upper deck, there was no roof, and thus virtually no protection from the oppressive Texas heat. For nearly all of its existence, it was the hottest stadium in the majors. It was not unusual for game-time temperatures to be well above . Combined with the Rangers' mediocre performance, this held down attendance considerably during the 1970s. Due in part to the heat, the Rangers scheduled nearly all of their games from May through September at night to get around it. Other than nearby amusement park Six Flags Over Texas, there was no neighborhood around the park. In his book Storied Stadiums, Curt Smith described it as "small, (but) not intimate".

The scoreboard in the Rangers' early days was a long, horizontal rectangle with a panel shaped like the state of Texas. It was replaced after the 1984 season with a new scoreboard and series of billboards that ran from both foul poles. "Cotton-Eyed Joe" was played during the seventh-inning stretch for fans to dance to instead of "Take Me Out to the Ballgame". Arlington Stadium was also the first major league ballpark to sell nachos (in 1974).

The stadium had two advantages. First, before installation of the wrap-around scoreboard and billboards, the predominant gusty winds from the south knocked down many fly balls that would otherwise have been home runs. Second, the large number of metal bleacher seats came in handy on Bat Night, the promotional game in most years when children age 13 and under received a real, full-size bat that could be pounded on the bleachers. During some seasons, it was the only sell-out for the usually poor Rangers squads then, and the spectacle of 10,000-15,000 kids banging their bats all at once created a deafening sound.

1990s

The stadium eventually began to show its age and inadequacy, and the City of Arlington approved the construction of a new stadium for the Rangers. The last game was played in Arlington Stadium on October 3, 1993, resulting in a 4–1 win by the visiting Kansas City Royals, witnessed by 41,039 fans (it was also the final game in the career of Hall-of-Famer George Brett). Following the  season, the Rangers moved to The Ballpark in Arlington, which was built nearby, and Arlington Stadium was demolished in 1994. The foul poles and home plate from Arlington Stadium were moved to the new ballpark, along with some of the bleachers. The bleachers were painted green, but their original blue color is occasionally visible in spots where the green paint has chipped. Home plate was inserted into place at the Ballpark in Arlington by Tom Schieffer (Texas Rangers tham president), Richard Greene (then mayor of Arlington), Tom Vandergriff (former mayor responsible for bringing the team to Arlington), and George W. Bush (then team part-owner; later Governor of Texas and President of the United States).

The site of the old stadium is just west of the Arlington Convention Center and north of the youth ballpark. It was partially paved in 2001 to provide parking for the Convention Center, and Legends Way was built through the center of the site in 2007 to provide an access road to the new Cowboys Stadium. The road was renamed AT&T Way in 2013 along with the corporate renaming of Cowboys Stadium. About a quarter of the former stadium site remains unpaved and undeveloped as of 2019.

Prior to the 2016 season, the original foul poles from Arlington Stadium were replaced at then-Globe Life Park in Arlington.

As of 2022, part of the site has been redeveloped as part of the National Medal of Honor Museum.

Notable moments
Arlington Stadium never saw a playoff game or an All-Star Game, but was host to several of Nolan Ryan's greatest moments, including his 5,000th strikeout and his seventh (and final) no-hitter. Baltimore Orioles shortstop Cal Ripken Jr. and Rangers outfielder Oddibe McDowell, were the only two players to hit for the cycle in Arlington Stadium. It was also the site of the 11th perfect game in Major League Baseball history, when Mike Witt of the California Angels defeated the Rangers on September 30, 1984, 1–0.

A memorable brawl happened on August 4, 1993, when the Rangers hosted the Chicago White Sox. Ryan, the starter for that game, hit Robin Ventura with a pitch. Ventura decided to charge the mound, which emptied both benches. As Ventura reached the mound, Ryan immediately caught him in a head lock and punched him on the top of his head six times.

References

External links 

Ballparks.com: Arlington Stadium
Ballparks of Baseball: Arlington Stadium
Ballpark Reviews: Arlington Stadium
Ballpark Tour: Arlington Stadium

Defunct baseball venues in the United States
Defunct college football venues
Defunct Major League Baseball venues
Defunct multi-purpose stadiums in the United States
Texas–Arlington Mavericks football
UT Arlington Mavericks sports venues
Texas Rangers stadiums
Dallas Tornado sports facilities
North American Soccer League (1968–1984) stadiums
Southland Conference Baseball Tournament venues
American football venues in the Dallas–Fort Worth metroplex
Baseball venues in the Dallas–Fort Worth metroplex
Demolished sports venues in Texas
Sports venues in Arlington, Texas
Sports venues completed in 1965
Sports venues demolished in 1994
1965 establishments in Texas
1994 disestablishments in Texas
20th century in Arlington, Texas